Henry Arthur Koning (born 29 June 1960 in Zaandam) is a sailor from the Netherlands, who represented his country at the 1988 Summer Olympics in Pusan. With Hans Schelling as crew, Koning took the 15th place in the Flying Dutchman.

Koning represented Bonaire during the 2008 Vintage Yachting Games in Medemblik in the Flying Dutchman with Rob Taal as crew. The team made 4th place. In the 2012 Koning and Taal returned to the Vintage Yachting Games in Lake Como also for Bonaire. They finished again 4th.

Professional life
Koning works as organizational consultant for the community of Purmerend.

Sources
 
 
 
 
 
 

1960 births
Living people
Dutch male sailors (sport)
Olympic sailors of the Netherlands
Sailors at the 1988 Summer Olympics – Flying Dutchman
Sailors at the 2008 Vintage Yachting Games
Sailors at the 2012 Vintage Yachting Games
Sportspeople from Zaanstad
20th-century Dutch people
21st-century Dutch people